Vigil in the Night is a serial novella by A. J. Cronin, initially published in 1939 in Good Housekeeping magazine. It tells the tale of two nurses: Anne Lee, who devotes herself to serving others, and her younger sister, Lucy, who tries to get everything in life for herself. When Lucy’s negligence causes the death of a young patient, Anne takes the blame to protect her sister, an act that threatens to destroy the bright career that lies before her. The story was printed in book form by various publishers and was adapted into a film, Vigil in the Night (1940).

1939 British novels
British novellas
Short stories by A. J. Cronin
Works originally published in Good Housekeeping
British novels adapted into films
1939 short stories